

Arthropods

Newly named insects

Dinosaurs
 Eugene Stebinger became the first to identify the Two Medicine Formation and to formally describe its first fossil finds, which were excavated the previous year.

Newly named dinosaurs
Data courtesy of George Olshevsky's dinosaur genera list.

Plesiosaurs

New taxa

Pterosaurs

New taxa

Synapsids

Non-mammalian

Footnotes

References
 Trexler, D., 2001, Two Medicine Formation, Montana: geology and fauna: In:  Mesozoic Vertebrate Life, edited by Tanke, D. H., and Carpenter, K., Indiana  University Press, pp. 298–309.

1910s in paleontology
Paleontology
Paleontology 4